Richard Betts may refer to:

Richard A. Betts, climate scientist at the Met Office Hadley Centre
Richard K. Betts (born 1947), Arnold A. Saltzman Professor of War and Peace Studies, Columbia University
Richard Betts (priest), Anglican priest

See also
Dickey Betts (born 1943), American musician
Richard Bett, professor in philosophy and classics at Johns Hopkins University